Gabriel de Castilla (1577 – c. 1620) was a Spanish explorer and navigator.  A native of Palencia, it has been argued that he was an early explorer of Antarctica.

Biography 
In March 1603, Castilla was at the head of an expedition that weighed anchor from Valparaiso.  Under his control were three ships: the galleon Jesús María, of 600 tons and 30 cannons, Nuestra Señora de la Visitación (which had belonged to Richard Hawkins) and Nuestra Señora de las Mercedes.  The expedition was entrusted by the Viceroy of Peru, Luis de Velasco, marqués de Salinas, to suppress the incursions of Dutch privateers in the seas to the south of Chile.

Historians conjecture that they penetrated to a latitude of (64° S) in the Southern Ocean, south of Drake Passage. If correct, this would be the farthest south that anyone had travelled, at that time.  Subsequently, several merchant vessels reported being blown south of 60° S rounding Cape Horn in severe weather.

See also 
List of Antarctic expeditions
Gabriel de Castilla Base

References

External links 
 The Spanish Antarctic station Gabriel de Castilla
 Don Gabriel de Castilla, primer avistador de la Antártica, by Chilean historian Isidoro Vázquez de Acuña (Spanish language)
 Revista Hidalguia num. 232-233 1992  p.356 et seq This links to another, incomplete but substantial, version of the above.

1577 births
1620s deaths
Spanish explorers
Spanish navigators
Explorers of Antarctica
16th-century Spanish people
17th-century Spanish people
People from Palencia
Spain and the Antarctic
Spanish people in the Viceroyalty of Peru